Catherine Beauchemin-Pinard (born June 26, 1994) is a Canadian judoka who competes in the women's 63 kg category. Beauchemin-Pinard won a bronze medal in the 63 kg weight class at the 2020 Summer Olympics, making her the second Canadian woman to win a medal in judo at the Summer Olympics. She has been ranked in the top 10 of the world in her weight category.

Career
In June 2016, she was named to Canada's Olympic team.

In 2021, she won one of the bronze medals in her event at the 2021 Judo Grand Slam Antalya held in Antalya, Turkey.

Beauchemin-Pinard competed as part of Canada's 2020 Olympic team in Tokyo. She won all her matches in the under-63 kg class before losing to world champion and eventual Olympic champion Clarisse Agbegnenou in the semifinals. Beauchemin-Pinard then won the bronze medal defeating Anriquelis Barrios by waza-ari in extra time. After her victory she said that,

She won a gold medal at the 2022 Commonwealth Games in Women's 63 kg.

She won a silver medal at the 2022 World Judo Championships.

See also
 Judo in Quebec
 Judo in Canada
 List of Canadian judoka

References

External links
 
 
 
 Catherine Beauchemin-Pinard at Judo Canada

Canadian female judoka
1994 births
Living people
French Quebecers
Judoka at the 2015 Pan American Games
Pan American Games silver medalists for Canada
Judoka at the 2016 Summer Olympics
Olympic judoka of Canada
Pan American Games medalists in judo
Medalists at the 2015 Pan American Games
Olympic bronze medalists for Canada
Medalists at the 2020 Summer Olympics
Judoka at the 2020 Summer Olympics
Olympic medalists in judo
20th-century Canadian women
21st-century Canadian women
Commonwealth Games medallists in judo
Judoka at the 2022 Commonwealth Games
Commonwealth Games gold medallists for Canada
Medallists at the 2022 Commonwealth Games